Maurice Trapp (born 31 December 1991) is a German professional footballer who plays as a centre-back for Mainz 05 II.

References

External links
 
 

1991 births
Living people
German footballers
Footballers from Berlin
Association football central defenders
2. Bundesliga players
3. Liga players
Regionalliga players
1. FC Union Berlin players
FC Hansa Rostock players
Goslarer SC 08 players
Berliner AK 07 players
Chemnitzer FC players
VfL Osnabrück players
1. FSV Mainz 05 II players